The Qoros 7 is a mid-size crossover SUV (sport utility vehicle) produced by the Chinese automobile manufacturer Qoros.

Overview

The Qoros 7 was launched in September 2020 as the first model of Qoros under Baoneng Investment Group's control. The model is also the flagship model of Qoros, as it is the largest model offered by Qoros up to date. 

The five-door SUV was launched at the 2020 Beijing Auto Show in November 2020, featuring a front face that inherits the design language of Qoros MILE II concept car revealed during the Shanghai Auto Show in 2019.

Specification
A wet dual-clutch seven-speed automatic gearbox is the only transmission option offered for the Qoros 7. Suspension for the Qoros 7 is MacPherson front struts with a multi-link independent rear setup, and electric power steering is developed by Bosch.

References

External links

Qoros vehicles
Cars of China
Front-wheel-drive vehicles
Mid-size sport utility vehicles
Crossover sport utility vehicles
Cars introduced in 2020